New-S is the sixteenth studio album by Japanese Jazz fusion band T-Square, released in 1991. This album marks the introduction of saxophonist Masato Honda to the band, after Takeshi Itoh left the group.

Track listing
Sources

References

T-Square (band) albums
1991 albums